Manipuri Hindus or Hindu Manipuris may refer to:
 Meitei Hindus, the predominant Hindu community of Manipur
 Meitei Brahmins, Meitei speaking Brahmins of Manipur
 any other Hindu people living in Manipur